The Global Electrified 1 (GE1) platform is an electric vehicle platform developed by Ford under its dedicated global battery electric vehicle team named Team Edison. It is a heavily modified version of the C2 platform.

Applications 

 Ford Mustang Mach-E (2020–present)

References

Ford platforms
Electric vehicle platforms